Pellegrino Piola (1617 – 25 November 1640), also called Pellegro Piola or il Pellegro, was an Italian painter of the Baroque period, active in Genoa.

He was born in Genoa, and at the age of twelve, apprenticed with Domenico and Giovanni Battista Capellino. He was the elder brother of the painter Domenico Piola. He was murdered during an altercation in Genoa, some claim by either his master or an elder painter envious of his skill. His brother was Domenico Piola.

Sources

Handbook for Travellers in Northern Italy: Comprising Piedmont, Liguria, Lombardy, Venetia John Murray (1860); p. 120.

References

1617 births
1640 deaths
17th-century Italian painters
Italian male painters
Painters from Genoa
Italian Baroque painters